Jun Ahn (안준) is a South Korean photographer, known primarily for her Self-Portrait series of photographs taken from atop high buildings. She has worked extensively in the United States, particularly in New York, as well as South Korea.

She has produced the books Self-Portrait (2018) and One Life (2018).

Career

Ahn was educated at the University of Southern California, graduating with a degree in art history in 2006, followed by two years of postgraduate study of photography at the Pratt Institute. While at the Pratt she began work on the Self-Portrait project.

In 2009 and in 2010 she was awarded the Dean's Scholarship at Parsons The New School for Design, and in 2011 received both the Dean's and a departmental scholarship. During this time her work received its first major exhibitions, including a joint exhibition with Kazue Taguchi at PS 122 in New York. The Parsons awarded her a Master of Fine Arts with honors in January 2012, following which she enrolled in a PhD program in photography at Hongik University in Seoul. Ahn received her phD degree in photography. Her dissertation investigates the aesthetic of high-speed photography and in a relation to performance and high-speed photography on her work.

Self-Portrait

Ahn's work involves three projects: Invisible Seascape, Float, and Self-Portrait. Self-Portrait depicts Ahn on or near the top of skyscrapers, often leaning from a window or seated on a ledge. Some are taken from a first-person perspective, showing her legs dangling into space as she looks down. The project stemmed from a photograph of her feet she took while sitting on the edge of an apartment building while a student at Pratt, and has continued since. The bulk of the photographs are from New York and Seoul, with some from Hong Kong.

For these photographs, Ahn works by gaining access to the building legitimately - it can take several months for the owners to give permission for the project - and setting a digital camera to take a large volume of high-speed images while she poses. These are then sifted to find a picture depicting Ahn looking unconcerned or distracted, captured in what she describes as "...a certain moment of time that did exist, but which we couldn't perceive with the naked eye because it happened too fast."

The Guardian reported that "In the most dangerous shots, such as when she is using her whole body to lean dangerously over the edge, a harness is sometimes used. She explains: "Of course it is not a safe situation. But I always try to be careful.""

Publications
Self-Portrait. Kyoto: Akaaka, 2018.
One Life. Tokyo: Case, 2018.

Exhibitions

Solo exhibitions
2012: Self-Portrait, Anna Nova Gallery, St. Petersburg, Russia
2013: Ahn Jun Solo Exhibition, Kips Gallery, New York AHAF 13’ Mandarin Oriental Hotel, Hong Kong
2014: Self-Portrait, Christophe Guye Galerie, Zurich, Switzerland
2015: On the Edge of Time, Mandarin Oriental Hotel, Hong Kong

Group exhibitions
2011: Parsons Festival, New York, United States
2013: The Youth Code, Christophe Guye Galerie, Zurich, Switzerland
2014: Double Mirror: Korean-American Artists, American University Museum, Washington, United States
2015: As Far as the Mind Can See, exd'15, Porto, Portugal
2016: Ich, Schirn Kunsthalle, Frankfurt, Germany

Awards
2013: "Ones To Watch," British Journal of Photography, London
2013: "Asian Artist to Watch in 2013," South China Morning Post, Hong Kong

References

External links

Gallery of Self-Portrait at My Modern Met

Living people
Year of birth missing (living people)
South Korean artists
South Korean photographers
South Korean women artists
South Korean women photographers